Philippa "Pippa" Maddams (born 1974) is a female British former mountain and fell runner who won the World Long Distance Mountain Running Challenge in 2011.

She won the British Fell Running Championships three consecutive times from 2009 to 2011 as well as the English title in 2009.

Her race victories include Wasdale in 2009, Borrowdale in 2010 and the Snowdon Race in 2011.

References

External links
 Pippa Maddams at Scottish Hill Racing

1974 births
Living people
British female mountain runners
British fell runners
Sportspeople from Cumbria
World Long Distance Mountain Running Championships winners